Androstenedione, or 4-androstenedione (abbreviated as A4 or Δ4-dione), also known as androst-4-ene-3,17-dione, is an endogenous weak androgen steroid hormone and intermediate in the biosynthesis of estrone and of testosterone from dehydroepiandrosterone (DHEA). It is closely related to androstenediol (androst-5-ene-3β,17β-diol).

Biological function
Androstenedione is a precursor of testosterone and other androgens, as well as of estrogens like estrone, in the body. In addition to functioning as an endogenous prohormone, androstenedione also has weak androgenic activity in its own right.

Androstenedione has been found to possess some estrogenic activity, similarly to other DHEA metabolites. However, in contrast to androstenediol, its affinity for the estrogen receptors is very low, with less than 0.01% of the affinity of estradiol for both the ERα and ERβ.

Adrenarche
In children aged 6 to 8 years old, there is a rise in androstenedione secretion along with DHEA during adrenarche. This rise in androstenedione and DHEA is hypothesized to play a crucial role for learning social, cultural and ecological skills, such as the development and understanding of sexual attraction. Furthermore, it is thought that androstenedione plays a role in levels of aggression and competition in boys, as a positive correlation between the two were observed, while testosterone levels were below detection.

Biochemistry

Biosynthesis

Androstenedione is the common precursor of the androgen and estrogen sex hormones.

Androstenedione can be biosynthesized in one of two ways. The primary pathway involves conversion of 17α-hydroxypregnenolone to DHEA by way of 17,20-lyase, with subsequent conversion of DHEA to androstenedione via the enzyme 3β-hydroxysteroid dehydrogenase. The secondary pathway involves conversion of 17α-hydroxyprogesterone, most often a precursor to cortisol, to androstenedione directly by way of 17,20-lyase. Thus, 17,20-lyase is required for the synthesis of androstenedione, whether immediately or one step removed.

Androstenedione is produced in the adrenal glands and the gonads. The production of adrenal androstenedione is governed by adrenocorticotrophic hormone (ACTH), whereas production of gonadal androstenedione is under control by the gonadotropins. In premenopausal women, the adrenal glands and ovaries each produce about half of the total androstenedione (about 3 mg/day). After menopause, androstenedione production is about halved, due primarily to the reduction of the steroid secreted by the ovary. Nevertheless, androstenedione is the principal steroid produced by the postmenopausal ovary.

Some androstenedione is also secreted into the plasma, and may be converted in peripheral tissues to testosterone and estrogens.

Metabolism
Androstenedione is converted to either testosterone or estrone. Conversion of androstenedione to testosterone requires the enzyme 17β-hydroxysteroid dehydrogenase. Androstenedione is released into the blood by theca cells. Conversion of androstenedione to estrone requires the enzyme aromatase. Androstenedione is a substrate for estrogen production in granulosa cells which produce aromatase. Thus, theca cells and granulosa cells work together to form estrogens.

Androstanedione is a 5α-reduced metabolite of 4-androstenedione which serves as an intermediate in the biosynthesis of the androgen and neurosteroid androsterone.

Levels
Levels are normally 30–200 ng/dL (1.0–7.0 nmol/L) in females and 40–150 ng/dL (1.4–5.2 nmol/L) in males. 

In premature infants, serum androstenedione levels hover between 80 and 446 ng/dL. In full-term newborns, levels range from 20 to 290 ng/dL, and between 1 month and 1 year old, serum levels typically stay at less than 69 ng/dL.

Serum levels of androstenedione greater than or equal to 500 ng/dL may indicate the presence of an adrenal or gonadal tumor.

Pharmacology
Androstenedione has been shown to increase serum testosterone levels over an eight-hour period in men when taken as a single oral dose of 300 mg per day, but a dose of 100 mg had no significant effect on serum testosterone. However, serum levels of estradiol increased following both the 100 mg and 300 mg doses. The study also reported that the serum level of estrogens and testosterone produced varied widely between individuals.

A 2006 review paper summarized several studies that examined the effect of androstenedione on strength training. At dosages of 50 mg or 100 mg per day, androstenedione had no effect on muscle strength or size, or on body fat levels. One study used a daily dosage of 300 mg of androstenedione combined with several other supplements, and also found no increase in strength when compared to a control group that did not take the supplements.

The review authors speculate that sufficiently high doses may indeed lead to increased muscle size and strength. However, due to the federal ban on androstenedione supplements, it is difficult to carry out new research on its effects. The review authors conclude that individuals should not use androstenedione supplements due to the lack of evidence of beneficial effects, the wide variation in individual responses to the supplement, and the risk of unknown side effects.

Medical use
Under the brand name Metharmon-F and in combination with sex steroids (pregnenolone, testosterone, estrone, androstenediol) and thyroid hormone (desiccated thyroid), androstenedione is or has been marketed for medical use in Thailand.

Chemistry

Androstenedione, also known as androst-4-ene-3,17-dione, is a naturally occurring androstane steroid and a 17-ketosteroid. It is closely related structurally to androstenediol (A5; androst-5-ene-3β,17β-diol), dehydroepiandrosterone (DHEA; androst-5-en-3β-ol-17-one), and testosterone (androst-4-en-17β-ol-3-one), as well as to 5α-androstanedione (5α-androstane-3,17-dione) and estrone (estra-1,3,5(10)-triene-3-ol-17-one or 19-norandrost-1,3,5(10)-triene-3-ol-17-one).

History

Use as a supplement
Androstenedione was manufactured as a dietary supplement, often called andro or andros for short. Sports Illustrated credits Patrick Arnold with introducing androstenedione to the North American market. Androstenedione was legal and able to be purchased over the counter, and, as a consequence, it was in common use in Major League Baseball throughout the 1990s by record-breaking sluggers like Mark McGwire.

Barry R. McCaffrey, in his capacity as director of the White House Office of National Drug Control Policy from 1996 to 2001, determined that androstenedione could not be classified as an anabolic steroid because there is no proof that it promotes muscle growth.

Society and culture

Regulation
Androstenedione is banned by the World Anti-Doping Agency, and from the Olympic Games. The International Olympic Committee in 1997 banned androstenedione and placed it under the category of androgenic-anabolic steroids. Androstenedione is banned by MLB, the NFL, USOC, NCAA, and by the NBA.

On March 12, 2004, the Anabolic Steroid Control Act of 2004 was introduced into the United States Senate. It amended the Controlled Substance Act to place both anabolic steroids and prohormones on a list of controlled substances, making possession of the banned substances a federal crime. The law took effect on January 20, 2005. However, androstenedione was legally defined as an anabolic steroid, even though there is scant evidence that androstenedione itself is anabolic in nature. On April 11, 2004, the United States Food and Drug Administration banned the sale of androstenedione, citing that the drug poses significant health risks commonly associated with steroids. Androstenedione is currently banned by the U.S. military.

References
 Androstenedione

 Citations

Androgens and anabolic steroids
Androstanes
Diketones
Estrogens
Pregnane X receptor agonists